Farrar is an unincorporated community in Polk County, Iowa, United States. An unused elementary school building and one church are located in Farrar and 13 houses. The mayor of Farrar is Zach Stiles.

History
Farrar owes its development to the railroad line that was developed through the area in 1902-1903 
, and was consequently named in honor of one of the railroad employees involved in the creation of that line.  A post office was established in 1904.

Farrar's population was 42 in 1925.

Education
The Bondurant–Farrar Community School District operates local area public schools.

References

External links
Map of Farrar

Unincorporated communities in Polk County, Iowa
Unincorporated communities in Iowa